Re:Living is the fifth studio album by American hip hop artist Large Professor. It was released on June 9, 2015, on Fat Beats Records.

Track listing 
All songs produced by Large Professor, except track 9 produced by J-Love and co-produced by Large Professor.
"Re:Living" – 2:41
"Dreams Don't Die" – 2:45
"Opulence" – 3:10
"Earn" – 2:41
"Off Yo Azz on Yo Feet" – 3:03
"In the Scrolls" (featuring G-Wiz) – 2:39
"Own World" (featuring Fortune) – 3:04
"Sophia Yo" – 2:21
"New Train Ole Route" – 3:06
"Industry RMX 2" (featuring Inspectah Deck, Cormega, Roc Marciano, Sadat X & Lord Jamar) – 4:29
"NDN" – 2:20

References 

2015 albums
Albums produced by Large Professor
Fat Beats Records albums
Large Professor albums